Anarchic System is compilation album of the Anarchic System.
This release belongs to a promotional serie by Impact Distributions, featuring both well-known artists and beginners from the AZ records catalog. At least twelve albums shared identical design, with face caption on the front cover, with only variation in background colors.

Track listing 

A Side :
 "I Made up my Mind to Make Love" (C. Gordanne, I Wira) — 3:05
 "Winter Regal" (P. de Senneville, O. Toussaint) — 2:36
 "Marjory so Tenderly" (C. Gordanne, I Wira) — 3:02
 "Charmer Rock" (C. Gordanne, I Wira) — 2:08
 "Mini" (C. Gordanne, I Wira) — 2:47
 "Carmen Brasilia" (Georges Bizet) — 2:13

B Side :
 "Cherie Sha la la" (Van Loo, C. Gordanne, I Wira)— 2:51
 "Suspense" (P. de Senneville, O. Toussaint) — 2:20
 "Good Morning Love" (C. Gordanne, I Wira) — 1:54
 "Popcorn" (Gershon Kingsley) — 3:30
 "Barbara" (C. Gordanne, I Wira) — 2:48
 "Royal Summer" (C. Gordanne, I Wira, Michaele, Ibach) — 2:43

Personnel 
 Side A, arrangement by C. Gordanne, except A6 by I. Wira and C. Gordanne.
 Side A, sixth song and Side B, second song directed by Hervé Roy.
 Side B, third song arranged by C. Gordanne.

Distribution 
for France : Delphine for AZ Records, Distribution Impact index catalog 6886 611.

Anarchic System albums
1972 compilation albums